Aira Kaal (until 1938 Alma-Vilhelmine Kaal, from 1939 Aira Hone; 7 November 1911, in Uuemõisa Parish, Saare County – 7 April 1988) was an Estonian writer.

From 1931 to 1940, she studied in Tartu University, focusing on philosophy, but also learning Estonian literature, world literature and English. From 1938 to 1939, she worked in Great Britain, where she met her husband Arthur Robert Hone, with whom she would return to Estonia. From 1945 to 1950, she was a lecturer in the Tartu State University, teaching the foundations of Marxism-Leninism.

In 1980, she was one of the signatories of the "Letter of 40 intellectuals".

Works
 1966-1978: prose trilogy "Kodunurga laastud" ('Short Accounts on the Home Corner', 1966, 1970, 1978)
 1976: poetry collection "Hetked merega"
 1986: short prose collection "Seitse tõtt ja seitse valet" ('Seven Truths and Seven Lies')

References

1911 births
1988 deaths
Estonian women writers
Estonian women poets
20th-century Estonian poets
University of Tartu alumni
People from Saaremaa Parish
Soviet poets
Academic staff of the University of Tartu